Patrick Hansen (born 28 October 1998) is a motorcycle speedway rider from Denmark.

Career
He rode in the Individual Speedway European Championship and finished in 12th place during the 2021 Speedway European Championship.

References 

Living people
1998 births
Danish speedway riders
People from Kalundborg
Sportspeople from Region Zealand